LEAFY (abbreviated LFY) is a plant gene that causes groups of undifferentiated cells called meristems to develop into flowers instead of leaves with associated shoots.

LEAFY is involved in floral meristem identity.

LEAFY encodes a plant-specific transcription factor, is found in all land plants and in charophytes and one of its exons have been used extensively in phylogenetic work on spermatophytes. When the gene is overexpressed, the plant is less sensitive to environmental signals and flowers earlier.

The LEAFY protein has two conserved domains: the DNA binding domain, a Helix-Turn-Helix motif buried inside a unique 7-helix fold and a Sterile Alpha Motif. It binds DNA as a dimer and its binding site has been identified both in vivo and in vitro.The F-box protein Unusual Floral Organs (UFO) is able to redirect LFY to binding sites that LFY cannot access alone and, together, they regulate genes involved in petal and stamen development (such as APETALA3, PISTILLATA or RABBIT EARS).

References

Plant development
Plant genes
Mutation